Saray is a village in the Nizip District, Gaziantep Province, Turkey. The village had a population of 559 in 2021.

References 

Villages in Nizip District